Beat slicing is the process of using computer programs to slice an audio file of a drumloop in smaller sections, separating different drumhits. This is employed to rearrange the beat with either a sequencer or play them with a sampler, with the results ranging from changing particular hits to completely rearranging the flow of the beat.

Slicing a beat also allows the tempo of the beat to be altered heavily in music sequencers, without resulting downsides such as the pitch being increased or decreased.

This process is the most prominent in genres of Drum and bass, Hip-Hop, Glitch and IDM, the two latter being notorious for their prominent artists rearranging and altering beats in extreme ways.

Common programs used for beat slicing

Ableton Live
BeatCleaver
ReCycle
Renoise
Reaktor
Max/MSP
FL Studio

References

Audio editors